Yousif Hassan is a UAE footballer. He currently plays as a midfielder for the Al Wasl FC Club in Dubai.

Hassan was transferred to Al Wasl FC from Al-Shaab (UAE) in summer 2008. And in Winter 2010, he was loaned back to Al Shaab

In the 2010/11 season, Yousif was loaned again by Al Wasl but this time to Ajman Club.

References

Living people
Al-Shaab CSC players
Emirati footballers
Al-Wasl F.C. players
Ajman Club players
UAE Pro League players
Association football midfielders
Year of birth missing (living people)